Martin Hundfeld (also Huntzfeld, possibly from Hundsfeld, a village some 20 km east of Würzburg) was an early 15th-century (died before 1452) German fencing master. His teaching is recorded by Peter von Danzig in  Cod. 44 A 8 and by Hans von Speyer in M I 29. Hundfeld is numbered among the "society of Liechtenauer" by Paulus Kal.

External links
Martin Hundfeld's Dagger

Historical European martial arts
German male fencers
15th-century German people
Year of birth missing
Year of death missing
Sportspeople from Wrocław